In mathematics and logic, plural quantification is the theory that an individual variable x may take on plural, as well as singular, values. As well as substituting individual objects such as Alice, the number 1, the tallest building in London etc. for x, we may substitute both Alice and Bob, or all the numbers between 0 and 10, or all the buildings in London over 20 stories.

The point of the theory is to give first-order logic the power of set theory, but without any "existential commitment" to such objects as sets.  The classic expositions are Boolos 1984 and Lewis 1991.

History 
The view is commonly associated with George Boolos, though it is older (see notably Simons 1982), and is related to the view of classes defended by John Stuart Mill and other nominalist philosophers.  Mill argued that universals or "classes" are not a peculiar kind of thing, having an objective existence distinct from the individual objects that fall under them, but "is neither more nor less than the individual things in the class".  (Mill 1904, II. ii. 2,also I. iv. 3).

A similar position was also discussed by Bertrand Russell in chapter VI of Russell (1903), but later dropped in favour of a "no-classes" theory.  See also Gottlob Frege 1895 for a critique of an earlier view defended by Ernst Schroeder.

The general idea can be traced back to Leibniz. (Levey 2011, pp. 129–133)

Interest revived in plurals with work in linguistics in the 1970s by Remko Scha, Godehard Link, Fred Landman, Friederike Moltmann, Roger Schwarzschild, Peter Lasersohn and others, who developed ideas for a semantics of plurals.

Background and motivation

Multigrade (variably polyadic) predicates and relations 
Sentences like
 Alice and Bob cooperate.
 Alice, Bob and Carol cooperate.
are said to involve a multigrade (also known as variably polyadic, also anadic) predicate or relation ("cooperate" in this example), meaning that they stand for the same concept even though they don't have a fixed arity (cf. Linnebo & Nicolas 2008). The notion of multigrade relation/predicate has appeared as early as the 1940s and has been notably used by Quine (cf.  Morton 1975). Plural quantification deals with formalizing the quantification over the variable-length arguments of such predicates, e.g. "xx cooperate" where xx is a plural variable. Note that in this example it makes no sense, semantically, to instantiate xx with the name of a single person.

Nominalism

Broadly speaking, nominalism denies the existence of universals (abstract entities), like sets, classes, relations, properties, etc. Thus the plural logic(s) were developed as an attempt to formalize reasoning about plurals, such as those involved in multigrade predicates, apparently without resorting to notions that nominalists deny, e.g. sets.

Standard first-order logic has difficulties in representing some sentences with plurals.  Most well-known is the Geach–Kaplan sentence "some critics admire only one another".  Kaplan proved that it is nonfirstorderizable (the proof can be found in that article). Hence its paraphrase into a formal language commits us to quantification over (i.e. the existence of) sets.

Boolos argued that 2nd-order monadic quantification may be systematically interpreted in terms of plural quantification, and that, therefore, 2nd-order monadic quantification is "ontologically innocent".

Later, Oliver & Smiley (2001), Rayo (2002), Yi (2005) and McKay (2006) argued that sentences such as

They are shipmates
They are meeting together
They lifted a piano
They are surrounding a building
They admire only one another

also cannot be interpreted in monadic second-order logic.  This is because predicates such as "are shipmates", "are meeting together", "are surrounding a building" are not distributive.  A predicate F is distributive if, whenever some things are F, each one of them is F.  But in standard logic, every monadic predicate is distributive.  Yet such sentences also seem innocent of any existential assumptions, and do not involve quantification.

So one can propose a unified account of plural terms that allows for both distributive and non-distributive satisfaction of predicates, while defending this position against the "singularist" assumption that such predicates are predicates of sets of individuals (or of mereological sums).

Several writers have suggested that plural logic opens the prospect of simplifying the foundations of mathematics, avoiding the paradoxes of set theory, and simplifying the complex and unintuitive axiom sets needed in order to avoid them.

Recently, Linnebo & Nicolas (2008) have suggested that natural languages often contain superplural variables (and associated quantifiers) such as "these people, those people, and these other people compete against each other" (e.g. as teams in an online game), while Nicolas (2008) has argued that plural logic should be used to account for the semantics of mass nouns, like "wine" and "furniture".

Formal definition 

This section presents a simple formulation of plural logic/quantification approximately the same as given by Boolos in Nominalist Platonism (Boolos 1985).

Syntax 

Sub-sentential units are defined as

(with appropriate arities, which are left implicit)

Full sentences are defined as

 If  is a sentence, then so is 

The last two lines are the only essentially new component to the syntax for plural logic. Other logical symbols definable in terms of these can be used freely as notational shorthands.

This logic turns out to be equi-interpretable with monadic second-order logic.

Model theory 

Plural logic's model theory/semantics is where the logic's lack of sets is cashed out. The new component  is a binary relation relating values in the domain to plural variable symbols.

Satisfaction is given as

  iff 
  iff 
  iff  and 
  iff there is an  such that 
  iff 
  iff there is an  such that 

As in the syntax, only the last two are truly new in plural logic. Boolos observes that by using assignment relations , the domain does not have to include sets, and therefore plural logic achieves ontological innocence while still retaining the ability to talk about the extensions of a predicate. Thus, the plural logic comprehension schema  does not yield Russell's paradox because the quantification of plural variables does not quantify over the domain. Another aspect of the logic as Boolos defines it, crucial to this bypassing of Russell's paradox, is the fact that sentences of the form  are not well-formed: predicate names can only combine with singular variable symbols, not plural variable symbols.

This can be taken as the simplest, and most obvious argument that plural logic as Boolos defined it is ontologically innocent.

See also 
 Generalized quantifier
 Variadic function

Notes

References 
 George Boolos, 1984, "To be is to be the value of a variable (or to be some values of some variables)," Journal of Philosophy 81: 430–449. In Boolos 1998, 54–72.
 --------, 1985, "Nominalist platonism." Philosophical Review 94: 327–344. In Boolos 1998, 73–87.
 --------, 1998. Logic, Logic, and Logic. Harvard University Press.
 Burgess, J.P., "From Frege to Friedman: A Dream Come True?"
 --------, 2004, “E Pluribus Unum: Plural Logic and Set Theory,” Philosophia Mathematica 12(3): 193–221.
 Cameron, J. R., 1999, "Plural Reference," Ratio.
 
 De Rouilhan, P., 2002, "On What There Are," Proceedings of the Aristotelian Society: 183–200.
 Gottlob Frege, 1895, "A critical elucidation of some points in E. Schroeder's Vorlesungen Ueber Die Algebra der Logik," Archiv für systematische Philosophie: 433–456.
 Fred Landman 2000. Events and Plurality. Kluwer.

 David K. Lewis, 1991. Parts of Classes. London: Blackwell.
 

 John Stuart Mill, 1904, A System of Logic, 8th ed. London: .
 Moltmann, Friederike, 1997, Parts and Wholes in Semantics. Oxford University Press, New York. 
 Moltmann, Friederike, 'Plural Reference and Reference to a Plurality. Linguistic Facts and Semantic Analyses'. In M. Carrara, A. Arapinis and F. Moltmann (eds.): Unity and Plurality. Logic, Philosophy, and Semantics. Oxford University Press, Oxford, 2016, pp. 93-120.
 
 
 
 
 --------, 2006, “Beyond Plurals,” in Rayo and Uzquiano (2006).
 --------, 2007, “Plurals,” forthcoming in Philosophy Compass.
 --------, and Gabriel Uzquiano, eds., 2006. Absolute Generality Oxford University Press.
 Bertrand Russell, B., 1903. The Principles of Mathematics. Oxford Univ. Press.
 Peter Simons, 1982, “Plural Reference and Set Theory,” in Barry Smith, ed., Parts and Moments: Studies in Logic and Formal Ontology. Munich: Philosophia Verlag.
 --------, 1987. Parts. Oxford University Press.
 
 
 --------, 2005, “The Logic and Meaning of Plurals, Part I,” Journal of Philosophical Logic 34: 459–506.
 Adam Morton. "Complex individuals and multigrade relations." Noûs (1975): 309-318. 
 Samuel Levey (2011) "Logical theory in Leibniz" in Brandon C. Look (ed.) The Continuum Companion to Leibniz, Continuum International Publishing Group,

External links 
 
 Moltmann, Friederike. (August 2012) "Plural Reference and Reference to a Plurality. A Reassessment of the Linguistic Facts"
 A more extensive bibliography
 https://web.archive.org/web/20150211224457/http://lumiere.ens.fr/~amari/genius/PapersSeminar/Nicolas-Semantics-for-plurals-Handout-0110.pdf

Quantifier (logic)